Sharon Knight is a San Francisco-based neopagan composer, singer, and multi-instrumentalist known for writing, recording, and performing Celtic fusion music she calls Neofolk Romantique. She also records and performs harder edged music with Middle Eastern themes as the frontperson of the pagan rock/folk metal group Pandemonaeon. Knight is the co-owner of Trance Jam Records.

Biography 
Sharon Elizabeth Knight was born on January 8, 1966, and raised in Redwood City, California. She studied in the Feri tradition of witchcraft with Gabriel Carrillo and has also studied Thelema and Tibetan Buddhism. In 1994, she married the German musician Winter, who has been her musical collaborator since.

Career 
Knight's first album, Incantation, was released in 1996, followed by the self-titled Pandemonaeon debut (2001), Temple of Dreams-Live!  (2003), and her second solo album, Song of the Sea  (2004), which features two duets with Shay Black of the Black Family. Two of Knight's songs from Song of the Sea, "May Morning Dew" and "Song of the Sea", also appear on Sequoia Records' Celtic Lounge I (2006) and Celtic Lounge II (2007). The latter also contains a music video for "Song of the Sea. Knight has also collaborated with electronica artist Hands Upon Black Earth (Hands Upon Black Earth, 2004; Translucent, 2009), pagan author T. Thorn Coyle (Songs for the Waning Year: A Collection of Chants to Celebrate the Dark Time of the Year, 2008; Songs for the Strengthening Sun: A Collection of Chants to Celebrate the Return of the Sun, 2009). Her third Pandemonaeon album, Dangerous Beauty, was released in 2010. In 2013 Knight released her third solo album, Neofolk Romantique, another blend of original songs and Celtic traditionals.

Knight and Winter have been touring nationally since 2010.

Genre and work 
Knight's solo work has generally been classified by some retailers as Celtic new age even though there are many more cross-cultural elements involved in her music. The same is true for her rock/folk metal band, Pandemonaeon, which due to its Middle Eastern and Goth influence, she describes as "music for bellydancers in combat boots." In her Celtic work, Knight is most often compared to Loreena McKennitt and Stevie Nicks, although her early musical influences are Planxty, Steeleye Span, Pentangle, and Fairport Convention.

Discography 
Flowinglass Music - First of May, For Earth and Her People (1986)
Morrigan Records - Various Artists, Fire & Stone: Pagan Rock Volume 1 (1999)
Trance Jam Records
Sharon Knight, Incantation (1996)
Pandemonaeon, Pandemonaeon (2001)
Pandemonaeon, Temple of Dreams - Live! (2003)
Sharon Knight, Siren Songs (2004)
Sharon Knight, Song of the Sea (2004)
Sharon Knight & T. Thorn Coyle, Songs for the Waning Year: A Collection of Chants to Celebrate the Dark Time of the Year, (2008)
Sharon Knight & T. Thorn Coyle, Songs for the Strengthening Sun: A Collection of Chants to Celebrate the Return of the Sun, (2009)
Pandemonaeon, Dangerous Beauty (2010)
Sharon Knight, Neofolk Romantique (2013)
Sharon Knight, Portals (2016)
Seqouia Records
Various Artists, Celtic Lounge I (2006)
Various Artists, Celtic Lounge II (2007)
Cyberset Music - Hands Upon Black Earth, Hands Upon Black Earth (2004)
Hrair Tanielian - Raven, 345-S (2008)
Asizazoon Music - Hands Upon Black Earth, Translucent (2009)
Banshee Records - Various Artists, The Best of Pagan Folk 2 (2012)

Videos 
Song of the Sea (El Mundo Bueno Studios, 2007)
Stretched on Your Grave (El Mundo Bueno Studios, 2009)

Other 
Cry For the Forest (Earthfilms, 1998, a short film about Julia Butterfly's Luna tree-sit, soundtrack use)
Dark Imaginations (Anaar, 2008, bellydance instructional DVD, soundtrack contribution)
Beatific Vision (Sountru, 2008, feature film, DVD, soundtrack contribution)
The Commune (Elisabeth Fies, 2009, feature film, DVD, soundtrack contribution)

References

External links
 Official website
 Pandemonaeon.net

American modern pagans
1966 births
Living people
American women composers
Feri Tradition
21st-century American composers
American women singers
Performers of modern pagan music
21st-century American women musicians
21st-century women composers